Znamenka or Znamyonka is the name of several inhabited localities in Russia.

Altai Krai
As of 2010, one rural locality in Altai Krai bears this name:
Znamenka, Altai Krai, a selo under the administrative jurisdiction of the town of krai significance of Slavgorod

Amur Oblast
As of 2010, one rural locality in Amur Oblast bears this name:
Znamenka, Amur Oblast, a selo in Znamensky Rural Settlement of Romnensky District

Republic of Bashkortostan
As of 2010, four rural localities in the Republic of Bashkortostan bear this name:
Znamenka, Belebeyevsky District, Republic of Bashkortostan, a selo in Znamensky Selsoviet of Belebeyevsky District
Znamenka, Kuyurgazinsky District, Republic of Bashkortostan, a village in Krivle-Ilyushkinsky Selsoviet of Kuyurgazinsky District
Znamenka, Tuymazinsky District, Republic of Bashkortostan, a village in Nikolayevsky Selsoviet of Tuymazinsky District
Znamenka, Yermekeyevsky District, Republic of Bashkortostan, a selo in Vosmomartovsky Selsoviet of Yermekeyevsky District

Belgorod Oblast
As of 2010, three rural localities in Belgorod Oblast bear this name:
Znamenka, Shebekinsky District, Belgorod Oblast, a khutor in Shebekinsky District
Znamenka, Starooskolsky District, Belgorod Oblast, a selo in Starooskolsky District
Znamenka, Valuysky District, Belgorod Oblast, a selo under the administrative jurisdiction of Urazovsky Settlement Okrug of Valuysky District

Bryansk Oblast
As of 2010, one rural locality in Bryansk Oblast bears this name:
Znamyonka, Bryansk Oblast, a settlement in Usozhsky Selsoviet of Komarichsky District

Chelyabinsk Oblast
As of 2010, two rural localities in Chelyabinsk Oblast bear this name:
Znamenka, Kaslinsky District, Chelyabinsk Oblast, a village in Grigoryevsky Selsoviet of Kaslinsky District
Znamenka, Nagaybaksky District, Chelyabinsk Oblast, a settlement in Fershampenuazsky Selsoviet of Nagaybaksky District

Chuvash Republic
As of 2010, one rural locality in the Chuvash Republic bears this name:
Znamenka, Chuvash Republic, a settlement in Altyshevskoye Rural Settlement of Alatyrsky District

Irkutsk Oblast
As of 2010, one rural locality in Irkutsk Oblast bears this name:
Znamenka, Irkutsk Oblast, a selo in Zhigalovsky District

Kaliningrad Oblast
As of 2010, four rural localities in Kaliningrad Oblast bear this name:
Znamenka, Bagrationovsky District, Kaliningrad Oblast, a settlement in Pogranichny Rural Okrug of Bagrationovsky District
Znamenka, Guryevsky District, Kaliningrad Oblast, a settlement in Dobrinsky Rural Okrug of Guryevsky District
Znamenka, Nesterovsky District, Kaliningrad Oblast, a settlement in Chistoprudnensky Rural Okrug of Nesterovsky District
Znamenka, Pravdinsky District, Kaliningrad Oblast, a settlement under the administrative jurisdiction of the urban-type settlement of district significance of  Zheleznodorozhny in Pravdinsky District

Karachay-Cherkess Republic
As of 2010, one rural locality in the Karachay-Cherkess Republic bears this name:
Znamenka, Karachay-Cherkess Republic, a selo in Prikubansky District

Kemerovo Oblast
As of 2010, one rural locality in Kemerovo Oblast bears this name:
Znamenka, Kemerovo Oblast, a village in Suslovskaya Rural Territory of Mariinsky District

Republic of Khakassia
As of 2010, one rural locality in the Republic of Khakassia bears this name:
Znamenka, Republic of Khakassia, a selo in Znamensky Selsoviet of Bogradsky District

Kirov Oblast
As of 2010, two rural localities in Kirov Oblast bear this name:
Znamenka, Darovskoy District, Kirov Oblast, a settlement in Kobrsky Rural Okrug of Darovskoy District
Znamenka, Yaransky District, Kirov Oblast, a mestechko in Znamensky Rural Okrug of Yaransky District

Komi Republic
As of 2010, one rural locality in the Komi Republic bears this name:
Znamenka, Komi Republic, a settlement in Znamenka Rural-Type Settlement Administrative Territory of Troitsko-Pechorsky District

Kostroma Oblast
As of 2010, one rural locality in Kostroma Oblast bears this name:
Znamenka, Kostroma Oblast, a village in Znamenskoye Settlement of Manturovsky District

Krasnoyarsk Krai
As of 2010, two rural localities in Krasnoyarsk Krai bear this name:
Znamenka, Kuraginsky District, Krasnoyarsk Krai, a village under the administrative jurisdiction of the work settlement of Bolshaya Irba in Kuraginsky District
Znamenka, Minusinsky District, Krasnoyarsk Krai, a selo in Znamensky Selsoviet of Minusinsky District

Kursk Oblast
As of 2010, three rural localities in Kursk Oblast bear this name:
Znamenka, Gorshechensky District, Kursk Oblast, a selo in Znamensky Selsoviet of Gorshechensky District
Znamenka, Medvensky District, Kursk Oblast, a selo in Vyshnedubovetsky Selsoviet of Medvensky District
Znamenka, Oboyansky District, Kursk Oblast, a village in Bykanovsky Selsoviet of Oboyansky District

Lipetsk Oblast
As of 2010, six rural localities in Lipetsk Oblast bear this name:
Znamenka, Dankovsky District, Lipetsk Oblast, a village in Voskresensky Selsoviet of Dankovsky District
Znamenka, Dolgorukovsky District, Lipetsk Oblast, a village in Voyskovokazinsky Selsoviet of Dolgorukovsky District
Znamenka, Izmalkovsky District, Lipetsk Oblast, a village in Ponomarevsky Selsoviet of Izmalkovsky District
Znamenka, Khlevensky District, Lipetsk Oblast, a village in Sindyakinsky Selsoviet of Khlevensky District
Znamenka, Krasninsky District, Lipetsk Oblast, a village in Alexandrovsky Selsoviet of Krasninsky District
Znamenka, Zadonsky District, Lipetsk Oblast, a village in Yuryevsky Selsoviet of Zadonsky District

Moscow Oblast
As of 2010, two rural localities in Moscow Oblast bear this name:
Znamenka, Mozhaysky District, Moscow Oblast, a village in Borisovskoye Rural Settlement of Mozhaysky District
Znamenka, Voskresensky District, Moscow Oblast, a village under the administrative jurisdiction of the work settlement of imeni Tsyurupy in Voskresensky District

Nizhny Novgorod Oblast
As of 2010, three rural localities in Nizhny Novgorod Oblast bear this name:
Znamenka, Bolsheboldinsky District, Nizhny Novgorod Oblast, a selo in Bolsheboldinsky Selsoviet of Bolsheboldinsky District
Znamenka, Kulebaksky District, Nizhny Novgorod Oblast, a village in Serebryansky Selsoviet of Kulebaksky District
Znamenka, Voznesensky District, Nizhny Novgorod Oblast, a village in Blagodatovsky Selsoviet of Voznesensky District

Novgorod Oblast
As of 2010, two rural localities in Novgorod Oblast bear this name:
Znamenka, Borovichsky District, Novgorod Oblast, a village in Zhelezkovskoye Settlement of Borovichsky District
Znamenka, Malovishersky District, Novgorod Oblast, a village in Verebyinskoye Settlement of Malovishersky District

Oryol Oblast
As of 2010, four inhabited localities in Oryol Oblast bear this name:

Urban localities
Znamenka, Orlovsky District, Oryol Oblast, an urban-type settlement in Orlovsky District

Rural localities
Znamenka, Maloarkhangelsky District, Oryol Oblast, a village in Lukovsky Selsoviet of Maloarkhangelsky District
Znamenka, Karandakovsky Selsoviet, Mtsensky District, Oryol Oblast, a village in Karandakovsky Selsoviet of Mtsensky District
Znamenka, Spassko-Lutovinovsky Selsoviet, Mtsensky District, Oryol Oblast, a village in Spassko-Lutovinovsky Selsoviet of Mtsensky District

Penza Oblast
As of 2010, one rural locality in Penza Oblast bears this name:
Znamenka, Penza Oblast, a settlement in Kamensky Selsoviet of Kamensky District

Primorsky Krai
As of 2010, one rural locality in Primorsky Krai bears this name:
Znamenka, Primorsky Krai, a selo in Pozharsky District

Pskov Oblast
As of 2010, one rural locality in Pskov Oblast bears this name:
Znamenka, Pskov Oblast, a village in Pskovsky District

Rostov Oblast
As of 2010, two rural localities in Rostov Oblast bear this name:
Znamenka, Azovsky District, Rostov Oblast, a settlement in Semibalkovskoye Rural Settlement of Azovsky District
Znamenka, Morozovsky District, Rostov Oblast, a settlement in Znamenskoye Rural Settlement of Morozovsky District

Ryazan Oblast
As of 2010, three rural localities in Ryazan Oblast bear this name:
Znamenka, Miloslavsky District, Ryazan Oblast, a selo in Bolshepodovechinsky Rural Okrug of Miloslavsky District
Znamenka, Alexandro-Nevsky District, Ryazan Oblast, a village in Pavlovsky Rural Okrug of Alexandro-Nevsky District
Znamenka, Pitelinsky District, Ryazan Oblast, a village in Petsky Rural Okrug of Pitelinsky District

Samara Oblast
As of 2010, two rural localities in Samara Oblast bear this name:
Znamenka, Bogatovsky District, Samara Oblast, a selo in Bogatovsky District
Znamenka, Yelkhovsky District, Samara Oblast, a selo in Yelkhovsky District

Smolensk Oblast
As of 2010, two rural localities in Smolensk Oblast bear this name:
Znamenka, Smolensky District, Smolensk Oblast, a village in Prigorskoye Rural Settlement of Smolensky District
Znamenka, Ugransky District, Smolensk Oblast, a selo in Znamenskoye Rural Settlement of Ugransky District

Tambov Oblast
As of 2010, five inhabited localities in Tambov Oblast bear this name:

Urban localities
Znamenka, Znamensky District, Tambov Oblast, a work settlement under the administrative jurisdiction of Znamensky Settlement Council of Znamensky District

Rural localities
Znamenka, Bondarsky District, Tambov Oblast, a selo in Mitropolsky Selsoviet of Bondarsky District
Znamenka, Nikiforovsky District, Tambov Oblast, a selo in Yaroslavsky Selsoviet of Nikiforovsky District
Znamenka, Petrovsky District, Tambov Oblast, a selo in Volchkovsky Selsoviet of Petrovsky District
Znamenka, Tokaryovsky District, Tambov Oblast, a village in Danilovsky Selsoviet of Tokaryovsky District

Tula Oblast
As of 2010, two rural localities in Tula Oblast bear this name:
Znamenka, Chernsky District, Tula Oblast, a village in Velyenikolskaya Rural Administration of Chernsky District
Znamenka, Novomoskovsky District, Tula Oblast, a village in Prokhorovsky Rural Okrug of Novomoskovsky District

Tver Oblast
As of 2010, two rural localities in Tver Oblast bear this name:
Znamenka, Rameshkovsky District, Tver Oblast, a village in Kiverichi Rural Settlement of Rameshkovsky District
Znamenka, Staritsky District, Tver Oblast, a village in Pankovo Rural Settlement of Staritsky District

Vladimir Oblast
As of 2010, one rural locality in Vladimir Oblast bears this name:
Znamenka, Vladimir Oblast, a village in Selivanovsky District

Voronezh Oblast
As of 2010, two rural localities in Voronezh Oblast bear this name:
Znamenka, Ertilsky District, Voronezh Oblast, a settlement in Pervoertilskoye Rural Settlement of Ertilsky District
Znamenka, Talovsky District, Voronezh Oblast, a selo in Abramovskoye 2-ye Rural Settlement of Talovsky District

Zabaykalsky Krai
As of 2010, one rural locality in Zabaykalsky Krai bears this name:
Znamenka, Zabaykalsky Krai, a selo in Nerchinsky District